Weymouth College is a further education college located in Weymouth, England. The college has over 4,000 students, studying on a wide range of practical and academic courses in many subjects. The college is part of The University of Plymouth Colleges network.

The college previously had a second site on Newstead Road, but consolidated to a single main campus at Cranford Avenue in 2000.

There was a private school (Eng: "public school") of the same name from 1862 to 1940 in Weymouth.

History

Grammar school
This site was opened in 1913 as Weymouth Secondary School, which in 1927 became known as Weymouth Grammar School. In 1939, the school began sharing this site with South Dorset Technical College. In the 1960s, the school moved to new premises in Chickerell Road, leaving the technical college with sole use of the site. The grammar school was co-educational with around 1,050 boys and girls administered by the South Dorset Divisional Executive of Dorset Education Committee.

Merger and formation
1985 saw the creation of the modern Weymouth College, a tertiary college, with the merging of the technical college with Weymouth College (the former Weymouth College site became known as the Cranford Avenue campus).

New site
In 2001, the Newstead Road site was sold for housing development, and all students based there were transferred to new facilities at the Cranford Avenue campus, creating the college as it exists today.

Recently, Weymouth College has expanded provision beyond its traditional curriculum offering. A sports centre and gym facility for public use was opened at the Cranford Avenue site, with the college additionally taking over the operation of the former Weymouth Sports Club site on Dorchester Road, now renamed as Redlands Community Sports Hub.

Alumni
 Mark Hix, chef

Weymouth Grammar School

 Charles Bawden, professor of Mongolian from 1970-84 at the School of Oriental and African Studies
 Brian Carter, former professional footballer.
 Flight Sergeant Dudley Heal (5 August 1916 - 7 February 1999), who flew with the Dambusters Raid as a navigator in Lancaster AJ-F with the third wave taking off at 12 minutes after midnight; the aircraft was the second to hit the Sorpe Dam, and returned safely
 Prof Graham Hutchings CBE FRS, chemist, Regius Professor of Chemistry since 2016 at Cardiff University
 Prof Nick Jennings CB FREng FRS, Vice-Chancellor and President Loughborough University
 Michael Middleton (priest)
 Air Vice-Marshal Victor Otter CBE, chief engineering officer 1956-59 of RAF Bomber Command and project director 1963-66 of the Hawker Siddeley P.1127/P.1154 (Harrier)
 Sue Porto, Chief Executive since 2018 of the Brandon Trust
 Maj-Gen Alec Walkling CB OBE, Colonel Commandant from 1973 to 1986 of the Royal Artillery

References

External links 
 Weymouth College website
 EduBase

Educational institutions established in 1985
College
College
Further education colleges in Dorset
Education in Dorset
1985 establishments in England